Thomas Kent Drees (born June 17, 1963) is a former Major League Baseball pitcher.

Career
Drees attended Creighton University, and in 1984 he played collegiate summer baseball with the Chatham A's of the Cape Cod Baseball League. He was selected by the White Sox in the 17th round of the 1985 MLB Draft.

Drees made headlines in  while pitching for the Vancouver Canadians. During that season, Drees pitched three no-hitters, including two consecutive ones on May 23 and May 28 (the latter of which was only seven innings). Overall, Drees won 12 games for Vancouver with a 3.37 ERA. He made his major league debut as a September call-up with the White Sox in 1991, and appeared in four major league games.

References

External links

1963 births
Living people
American expatriate baseball players in Canada
Baseball players from Des Moines, Iowa
Birmingham Barons players
Calgary Cannons players
Chatham Anglers players
Chicago White Sox players
Creighton Bluejays baseball players
Daytona Beach Admirals players
Gulf Coast White Sox players
Major League Baseball pitchers
Oklahoma City 89ers players
Peninsula White Sox players
Portland Beavers players
Vancouver Canadians players